The Maple Leaf 54 is a Canadian sailboat that was designed by Stan Huntingford as a motorsailer and first built in 1978.

Production
The design was built by Cooper Enterprises in Port Coquitlam, British Columbia, starting in 1978, but the company went out of business in 1990 and it is now out of production.

Design
The Maple Leaf 54 is a recreational keelboat, built predominantly of fibreglass, with wood trim. It has a cutter rig, a raked stem, a reverse transom, a skeg-mounted rudder controlled by a wheel and a fixed fin keel. It displaces  and carries  of lead ballast.

The design has sleeping accommodation for six people, with two berths in the bow cabin, two more just aft of the bow cabin and an aft cabin with a double berth. The galley is located on the port side just forward of the companionway ladder. The galley is "L"-shaped and is equipped with a three-burner stove and a double sink. A navigation station is opposite the galley, on the starboard side. There are two heads, one just aft of the bow cabin on the starboard side and one on the starboard side in the aft cabin.

Operational history
In 1984 review in Yachting magazine, Chris Caswell wrote, "the Maple Leaf series (48, 50, 54, 56 and 68) is distinctive for powerful hulls, graceful deckhouses, and center cockpits.

See also
List of sailing boat types

References

Keelboats
1970s sailboat type designs
Sailing yachts 
Motorsailers
Sailboat type designs by Stan Huntingford
Sailboat types built by Cooper Enterprises